Reginald Clinton Tongue (born April 11, 1973) is a former American football safety.

Early life
Tongue attended Lathrop High School in Fairbanks, Alaska.  As a senior for Lathrop,  Tongue played running back/defensive back and rushed for 932 yards and 12 scores.  On defense, he had 11 interceptions.  He was named 1990 Alaska football player of the year and signed a letter of intent to play RB for Oregon State University.

College career
Tongue attended and played football for the Oregon State Beavers.  Originally recruited as a running back, Tongue was redshirted his freshman year,  during his sophomore year, due to injuries in the defensive backfield Tongue moved to cornerback and eventually to free safety his junior year.  During his tenure, Reggie tied a pac-10 record with 4 interceptions returned for touchdowns.  He finished at OSU with 9 interceptions, 362 tackles and was named to the 2nd team all-pac-10 team in 1994 and the 1st team in 1995.

Professional career
Tongue was selected in the 2nd round (58th overall) in the 1996 NFL Draft by the Kansas City Chiefs.  He would play there for 4 seasons, until being picked up by the Seattle Seahawks for the 2000 season, where he played until 2004. In 2004 he played for the New York Jets and completed his career in 2005 with the Oakland Raiders.

NFL career statistics

External links
Database Football: Reggie Tongue stats

1973 births
African-American players of American football
American football safeties
Kansas City Chiefs players
Living people
New York Jets players
Oakland Raiders players
Oregon State Beavers football players
Players of American football from Baltimore
Sportspeople from Fairbanks, Alaska
Seattle Seahawks players
21st-century African-American sportspeople
20th-century African-American sportspeople